Jaye Griffiths (born 24 September 1963) is a British stage, television and voice-over actress. After playing Ros Henderson in the BBC series Bugs and D.I. Sally Johnson in the ITV procedural drama The Bill, she landed the role of Elizabeth Croft in the BBC soap opera Doctors. She has since portrayed roles including Janet Mander in Silent Witness, Elle Gardner in Casualty and its spin-off series, Holby City, and Yavalla in The Outpost.

Life and career
Griffiths trained at the Guildhall School of Music and Drama, and has appeared in many television dramas, including a starring role as Ros Henderson in the BBC series Bugs,  which ran for four series.  She can often be found in police or hospital dramas, where she has appeared in The Bill, Doctors, Always and Everyone, Instinct and Silent Witness. Other credits include Casualty, Between the Lines, Drop the Dead Donkey, Kingdom and Skins. She has also presented two BBC Schools television series, "Watch" and "Storytime".

In 2015, she guest starred in an episode of the medical drama Holby City. She played Jac in two episodes of the ninth series of Doctor Who. Griffiths played consultant Elle Gardner in Casualty from 2016 to 2019. On 16th January 2022 Griffiths appeared in  Vera in the episode "As the Crow Flies" in the role of Marti Kapp. 

Griffiths has also starred in theatre productions of William Shakespeare’s Macbeth where she played the role of Lady Macbeth.

Filmography

TV

Other roles

References

External links

English soap opera actresses
English television actresses
English stage actresses
Black British actresses
1963 births
Living people
English people of Zambian descent